Cowap is a surname. Notable people with the surname include:

 Henri Cowap (1861–1930), Australian politician
 Ian Cowap (1950–2016), English cricketer